Joseph William Rogers (3 July 1907 – 20 August 1966) was an Australian rules footballer who played with North Melbourne in the Victorian Football League (VFL).

Family
The eldest of the nine children of John Rogers (1864-1922), and Harriett Rogers (1868-1942), née Fox, Joseph William Rogers was born at Campbells Creek, Victoria on 3 July 1907.

He married Esther Altie Ross (1910-1993) in 1931.

Football
Rogers commenced his senior football career in the Victorian Football Association, initially playing with Coburg, and then with Northcote. 

He then spent two years playing with North Melbourne in the Victorian Football League and subsequently played with Camberwell in the Victorian Football Association again.

Military service
Rogers later served in the Australian Army during World War II.

Death
He died at Geelong, Victoria on 20 August 1966.

Notes

References
 
 World War Two Nominal Roll: Private Joseph William Rogers (V351028), Department of Veterans' Affairs.
 World War Two Service Record: Private Joseph William Rogers (V351028), National Archives of Australia.

External links 

Joe Rogers's playing statistics from The VFA Project

1907 births
1966 deaths
Australian rules footballers from Victoria (Australia)
Coburg Football Club players
Northcote Football Club players
North Melbourne Football Club players
Camberwell Football Club players